Hertingfordbury is a small village in Hertfordshire, England, close to the county town of Hertford. It was mentioned in the Domesday Book. Hertingfordbury is also the name of a neighbouring civil parish, which does not contain the village.  Hertingfordbury Village is located within the Castle ward of local government Hertford Town Council. The population of the civil parish as of the 2021 census was 689.

Location
Hertingfordbury lies one mile west of Hertford on the A414 road. Ribbon development along that road has yet to reach the village, which retains a rural character. The village straddles the River Mimram, on which was built a water mill in the 18th century, and lies just north of the River Lea.  The northern boundary of the village is Panshanger Park, with its Great Oak, considered by some to be the oldest oak in England.  It is situated within the Castle ward of Hertford Town Council, the London metropolitan green belt and is a named conservation area of East Herts District Council.

Although Hertingfordbury civil parish does not include the village, it does contain five smaller villages known as the "five greens". They are Birch Green, Cole Green, East End Green, Letty Green and Staines Green. Letty Green, to the west, has a grade II listed deconsecrated St John's Church. Between the villages are the hamlets of Cumberland Green, Labby Green and Pipers End. On 1 April 1924 St Andrew Rural parish was merged with Hertingfordbury, on 1 April 1935 the village of Hertingfordbury was transferred to Hertford.

Domesday Book
The village was mentioned in the Domesday Book of 1086 as Hertfordingberie, meaning "Stronghold of the people of Hertford":

St. Mary's Church

St. Mary's Church is situated on rising ground to the east of the village, overlooking the water meadows that lead down to the River Mimram. A church seems to have stood on this spot as early as the 13th century. Construction is mainly of local flints with stone dressing, and the roof is tiled. Extensive alterations and restorations were carried out in 1845 and 1890. Inside the church is some interesting alabaster work, including the pulpit, and oak carvings by a native of Oberammergau. The churchyard contains the unmarked grave of Jane Wenham, erroneously believed to be the last person to be sentenced to death for witchcraft in England. She was condemned by a Hertford court in 1712 but was given a reprieve from the death sentence and later granted a Royal pardon by Queen Anne. Originally from Walkern her cause was adopted by William Cowper, 1st Earl Cowper, and she lived out her days in a cottage on his land at Panshanger Park. Also buried in the churchyard are members of the Cowper family, and, under the yew tree by the west door, Benjamin Truman, owner of the Truman Brewery in the 18th century, which was at one time the biggest brewery in the world. The Camden Town Group artist, Spencer Gore, whose mother lived in Hertingfordbury, was buried in the churchyard, after dying in Richmond. An American heiress, Pauline Payne Whitney, who had married Lord Queenborough, is buried there as is their daughter, Dorothy Paget, a racehorse owner, whose horses won the Cheltenham Gold Cup seven times and the Champion Hurdle four. Her funeral procession included a string of race horses, whose jockeys included Gordon Richards.

The village
Both Hertingfordbury Park, former residence of the Cowper family, and St Joseph's in the Park, a private primary school, stand to the east of St. Mary's. Houses in the village include "Epcombs", a Georgian brick house and "Amores", which stands in a triangle in the centre of the village and is over 500 years old. A little to the south of the main village is "Roxford House" on St. Mary's Lane, a Grade II Listed Building, where Austrian composer Joseph Haydn stayed for the summer of 1791.  The White Horse is a 15th-century Georgian-fronted building that in the past was a staging post for the Reading to Cambridge coach. To the north-east of the church is the Old Rectory, formerly home of the Addis family, descendants of William Addis, inventor of the first mass-produced toothbrush. There was an Addis brush factory in Hertford from 1920 to the 1990s.

Mayflower Place was commissioned by Countess Cowper and built in 1910. It was originally for the workers and their families from the Panshanger Estate. It is now owned by the East Herts Lodge of Freemasons.

A by-pass was constructed in 1974. Since then the village has changed in character and now provides homes for those who commute daily to London rather than for farm workers.

Hertingfordbury was formerly served by Hertingfordbury railway station on the Hertford to Hatfield line. This was built for the Hertford & Welwyn Junction Railway and appeared in passenger timetables by 1858. Passenger services ceased in 1951 and the line eventually fell victim to the Beeching Axe when goods traffic ceased in 1966. The station was the setting for scenes in the 1936 film When Knights Were Bold, and an ITV children's TV programme, Catweazle in 1970. It has now been converted into a residence. The disused railway line is now the Cole Green Way, popular with walkers, riders and cyclists.

Hertingfordbury Cricket Club plays at the recreation ground as does Hertingfordbury Tennis Club, which was formed at a public meeting in 1961. There is an annual fete on the third Saturday in June to raise funds for the upkeep of the recreation ground.

References

External links

British History Online: pages on Hertingfordbury
Cole Green Way

Villages in Hertfordshire
Civil parishes in Hertfordshire
East Hertfordshire District